The Chongyi railway station is a planned railway station of Chengdu–Dujiangyan Intercity Railway. This station will be located in Chengdu, Sichuan, China.

See also
Chengdu–Dujiangyan Intercity Railway

References

Railway stations in Sichuan